WXVO-LD (channel 7) is a low-power television station in Pascagoula, Mississippi, United States, affiliated with Antenna TV. Owned by meteorologist Edward Saint Pé, it is the flagship station for Saint Pé's weather forecast service WeatherVision.

In July 2008, the then-WKFK-LP turned off its analog transmission and went to digital broadcasting over-the-air.

WKFK-LD moved to channel 13 from channel 7 after WDAM-TV's move to digital channel 7.

References

External links

Pascagoula, Mississippi
XVO-LD
Antenna TV affiliates
Grit (TV network) affiliates
Laff (TV network) affiliates
Court TV affiliates
Ion Mystery affiliates
Low-power television stations in the United States
Television channels and stations established in 2002
2002 establishments in Mississippi